HMS Spragge has been the name of more than one ship of the British Royal Navy, and may refer to:

 , a fireship purchased in 1673, renamed Young Spragge in 1677, and lost in 1693
 , a fireship of 1677
 , a destroyer leader cancelled in 1919
 , a frigate in service from 1944 to 1946

Royal Navy ship names